Mehran Mumtaz (born 4 July 2003) is a Pakistani cricketer. 

He made his first-class debut on 17 November 2021, for Northern in the 2021–22 Quaid-e-Azam Trophy. In December 2021, he was named in Pakistan's team for the 2022 ICC Under-19 Cricket World Cup in the West Indies.

Personal life
While the family is now based in Rawalpindi their roots lie in Kohta, Azad Kashmir.

References

External links
 

2003 births
Living people
Azad Kashmiri people
Pakistani cricketers
Cricketers from Rawalpindi